Lift  is a 2021 Indian Tamil-language horror thriller film written and directed by Vineeth Varaprasad in his directorial debut.  The film stars Kavin, Amritha Aiyer and Gayathri Reddy. It was directly released via Disney+ Hotstar on 1 October 2021. The film opened to positive reviews from critics, who noted that the only highlight was a passingly good main cast's performance.

Plot 

Guru Prasad joins as a team leader in Amrak, an IT company in Chennai. Guru is standoffish to his team members, but arouses the interest of Harini, an HR manager who is also new. At the end of the work day, everybody leaves except for Guru, who is given an important task by the VP, and several security guards. After completing his work, Guru attempts to use the lift. However, it malfunctions and he ends up on a random floor. He encounters several paranormal events and later witnesses a security guard committing suicide by slitting his own throat.

A petrified Guru attempts to escape, but is repeatedly foiled. He later encounters Harini, who has been locked in the records room while. She initially suspects Guru of locking her in, but changes her mind after encountering the abnormal events in the lift. Harini and Guru team up together to try to escape, but repeatedly fail. They encounter yet another security guard, who later hangs himself while attempting to verify their identity. The pair later see a news report (dated to the following day) which claims that they both died in a fire in the office building. Harini reveals that she was locked in the records room after attempting to destroy several old files at the behest of the VP. After several encounters with paranormal events, they come to the conclusion that there are two ghosts in the building, not one.

Guru forms a plan to survive, but Harini becomes possessed. The ghost taunts Guru and tells him that both he and Harini will die that night in the fire. Guru realises that the ghosts can only possess them while they are sound of mind, and smokes a cigarette with a drug, ensuring that Harini also inhales the smoke. With this, the ghost is no longer able to possess  Harini. In the process, Guru also sets fire to the records room. Guru saves Harini, and the pair go back to the lift. Guru had, earlier, cut partially through the cables of the lift, and the pair jump up and down in the lift to make the lift fall. Harini survives the fall, but Guru is severely injured and almost dies. The pair are rescued by emergency responders.

While Guru is still unconscious, he hallucinates the story of the two ghosts. Sundar and his fiancée Tara, worked in the same company as Guru and Harini, and were in fact the predecessors of their positions. When the greedy VP fires Sundar in order to take the credit for his work, Sundar commits suicide in the lift by slitting his own throat. The VP attempts to cover up his death as an accident, but Tara hides the file in the records room and hangs herself to ensure that the VP doesn't find out where it is. The two security guards (who were later forced into committing suicide by the ghosts) helped the VP to cover up the death.

Guru wakes up, and is visited by the new VP of the company, who attempts to threaten him and Harini into keeping quiet. Guru refuses to comply and gives the file that Tara had hidden to the police officer in charge of the investigation. The police officer reveals to Guru that three bodies had been found in the burnt-out office building: the two security guards, and the VP who had driven Sundar and Tara to their deaths.

The movie ends with news articles detailing the exploitation of employees in the IT industry, and how many of them have been driven to suicide due to the treatment of their employers.

Cast 
 Kavin as Guruprasad "Guru", TL of Delta Project and Harini's crush.
 Amritha Iyer as Harini, HR Manager of AMRAK and Guru's love interest
 Gayathri Reddy as Tara, former HR Manager of AMRAK and Sundar's fiancee (in past)
 Kiran Konda as Sundar, former TL of Delta Project and Tara's fiancee (in past)
 Balaji Venugopal as Vice President of AMRAK

Production 
The film project was announced by debutant director Vineeth Varaprasad. Kavin was cast as the lead actor and he began shooting for the film offer soon after his eviction from the third season of Bigg Boss Tamil. The principal photography of the film wrapped within just 20 days before the onset of the COVID-19 pandemic and the post-production work proceeded shortly after the end of film shooting.

Soundtrack 
The soundtrack album features two songs. The first single titled "Inna Mylu" was unveiled on 22 April 2021 and it became an instant hit, receiving 30 million views in YouTube.

References

External links 
 

2021 directorial debut films
2021 horror films
2021 thriller films
2021 horror thriller films
2020s ghost films
2020s Tamil-language films
Disney+ Hotstar original films
Films not released in theaters due to the COVID-19 pandemic
Films scored by Britto Michael
Films set in Chennai
Films set in elevators
Films set in offices
Indian ghost films
Indian horror thriller films